Mathyas Lefebure is the pen name of Mathieu Lefebvre, a Canadian writer from Quebec. He is best known for his debut novel D'où viens tu, berger?, a roman à clef about his own decision to abandon a career in marketing and public relations to become a shepherd in Provence after going through an existential crisis.

He made the move to France in 2004, after deciding that he was unfulfilled in his existing career.

His second novel, Le Grand livre des fous, followed in 2010.

D'où viens tu, berger? was selected for the 2007 edition of Le Combat des livres, where it was defended by sports journalist Robert Frosi.

References

External links

21st-century Canadian novelists
Canadian male novelists
Canadian expatriates in France
Canadian novelists in French
Writers from Quebec
Living people
Canadian expatriate writers
21st-century Canadian male writers
Year of birth missing (living people)